The MasterCard Baltic Basketball League 2010–11 was the 7th season of the Baltic Basketball League and the second under the title sponsorship of Mastercard.  It was the fourth season of BBL as a two division league.

The format featured 14 teams in the Elite Division and 10 teams in the Challenge Cup.  Elite Division regular season started on September 29, 2010, and ended with the Final Four held in the Kaunas Sports Hall. It was won by BC Žalgiris who defeated BK VEF Rīga in the championship game on April 10, 2011. 
 
Challenge Cup regular season started  on October 12, 2010, and ended with two-legged finals between BC Juventus and KK Kaunas. The champions were BC Juventus who won both games.

Teams

Elite Division

† As winner of the 2009–10 Challenge Cup ‡ As runner-up of the 2009–10 Challenge Cup^ Qualified directly to playoffs

Challenge Cup

Elite Division

Regular season 
The Regular season began on October 29, 2010, with BK Ventspils hosting BC Rūdupis.

Playoffs 

2009–10 Elite Division finalists BC Žalgiris and BC Lietuvos Rytas qualified directly to quarterfinals where they were joined by the six top teams of the regular season.

Quarterfinals 
BC Žalgiris vs. BC Nevėžis
 

 

BK Ventspils vs. Tartu Ülikool/Rock 
 

 

Lietuvos Rytas vs. Šiauliai
 

 

BK VEF Rīga vs. BC Rūdupis

Semifinals

Third place game

Final

Challenge Cup

Regular season

Round 1 
Group A

Group B

Round 2

Play-offs

Semifinals 
BC Neptūnas vs. BC Juventus
 

 

BC Techasas vs. KK Kaunas

Third place games 
BC Neptūnas vs. BC Techasas

Finals 
BC Juventus vs. KK Kaunas

Relegation Playoffs 
TTÜ/Kalev and SK Valmiera from the Elite Division and the Challenge Cup finalists BC Juventus and KK Kaunas participate in a two-legged playoffs for two spots in the BBL Elite Division for 2011–12 season.

Qualification – Pair A

Qualification – Pair B 

 

 BC Juventus and KK Kaunas will play in the BBL Elite Division in the 2011–12 season.
 SK Valmiera and TTÜ/Kalev will be relegated to the BBL Challenge Cup for the 2011–12 season.

Individual statistics

Note: Excluded are all players who have played less than 10 games during all stages of the season in their respective division.

Awards

Elite Division season MVP 
  Artsiom Parakhouski (BK VEF Rīga)

Elite Division Final Four MVP 
  Tadas Klimavičius (BC Žalgiris)

MVP of the Month

References

External links 
 
 Eurobasket.com League Page

Baltic Basketball League seasons
2010–11 in European basketball leagues
2010–11 in Lithuanian basketball
2010–11 in Estonian basketball
2010–11 in Latvian basketball
2010–11 in Swedish basketball
2010–11 in Kazakhstani basketball